Claudiomiro Salenave Santiago (born 25 August 1971), known simply as Claudiomiro, is a Brazilian football coach and former player who played mainly as a central defender. He is the current assistant manager of Santos.

Claudiomiro began his career with Grêmio Santanense, and later represented Coritiba, Santos, Grêmio and Vitória. He subsequently moved to coaching, acting mainly as an assistant manager.

Playing career
Born in Santana do Livramento, Rio Grande do Sul, Claudiomiro made his senior debut with hometown side Grêmio Santanense on 12 April 1987, coming on as a substitute in a 6–2 Campeonato Gaúcho Segunda Divisão home win over Brasil de Quaraí, at the age of just 15. He began his career as an attacking midfielder, being later moved to the defensive midfield and then central defender positions.

Claudiomiro soon established himself as a regular starter for Santanense, helping in their promotion to the Campeonato Gaúcho in 1991. For the 1994 season, he signed for Coritiba.

Claudiomiro immediately became a starter for Coxa, helping in their promotion to the Série A in 1995. In March 1998, after scoring a career-best ten goals the previous season, he joined Santos.

Claudiomiro made his debut for Peixe on 28 March 1998, starting and being sent off in a 2–1 Campeonato Paulista away loss against São Paulo. Despite that, he was a regular starter for the side during his three-year spell, scoring the only goal of the club in the 1998 Copa CONMEBOL Finals.

On 13 July 2001, Claudiomiro was transferred to Grêmio for a fee of R$ 1 million. He played for the club until 2004, and retired in 2005 after playing for Vitória.

Post-playing career
After retiring, Claudiomiro became an assistant of Argel Fuchs (his teammate during his period at Santos), working at Mogi Mirim, Guaratinguetá, Caxias (two stints), Campinense, São José-RS, Criciúma, Guarani, Botafogo-SP, Brasiliense, Oeste, Joinville, Figueirense, Red Bull Brasil and América de Natal. On 13 February 2015, he returned to Joinville, again as an assistant.

In 2020, Claudiomiro was named Ivan Izzo's assistant at Taubaté. He returned to his former side Santos shortly after, being named assistant of Élder Campos at the under-17 team.

In 2022, when Élder was named manager of the under-20s for the year's Copa São Paulo de Futebol Júnior, Claudiomiro was also promoted to the squad as an assistant; he later continued to work in the team as an assistant of Orlando Ribeiro. On 3 August of that year, after Serginho Chulapa left the coaching staff of the first team, Claudiomiro became the side's new permanent assistant manager.

Career statistics

Honours
Santos
Copa CONMEBOL: 1999

Vitória
Campeonato Baiano: 2005

References

1971 births
Living people
People from Santana do Livramento
Sportspeople from Rio Grande do Sul
Brazilian footballers
Association football defenders
Campeonato Brasileiro Série A players
Campeonato Brasileiro Série B players
Coritiba Foot Ball Club players
Santos FC players
Esporte Clube Vitória players
Grêmio Foot-Ball Porto Alegrense players
Santos FC non-playing staff